Maxwell Alexander Rosenlicht (April 15, 1924 – January 22, 1999) was an American mathematician known for works in algebraic geometry, algebraic groups, and differential algebra.

Rosenlicht went to school in Brooklyn (Erasmus High School) and studied at Columbia University (B.A. 1947) and at Harvard University, where he studied under Zariski. He became a Putnam fellow twice, in 1946 and 1947. He was awarded in his doctorate on an Algebraic Curve Equivalence Concepts in 1950. In 1952, he went to Northwestern University. From 1958 until his retirement in 1991, he was a professor at Berkeley. He was also a visiting professor in Mexico City, IHÉS, Rome, Leiden, and Harvard University.

In 1960, he shared the Cole Prize in algebra with Serge Lang for his work on generalized Jacobian varieties. He also studied the algorithmic algebraic theory of integration.

Rosenlicht was a Fulbright Fellow and 1954 Guggenheim Fellow.

He died of neurological disease on a trip to Hawaii. Rosenlicht married in 1954 and had four children.

Publications

References 
 The article was initially created as a translation (by Google) of the corresponding article in German Wikipedia.

External links

Obituary, Berkeley
Rosenlicht at University of California, Berkeley

1924 births
1999 deaths
20th-century American mathematicians
Harvard University alumni
University of California, Berkeley faculty
Mathematicians from New York (state)
Erasmus Hall High School alumni
Putnam Fellows